Bassa is a Local Government Area in the north of Plateau State, Nigeria, bordering Kaduna and Bauchi States. Its headquarters are in the town of Bassa at.

It has an area of 1,743 km with other small towns like Miango, Mc Alley; originally called Biciza, Jengre, villages such as Binchin, Zukku, Kwal, Saya, Gurum among many others and a population of 186,859 at the 2006 census. Bassa local government houses the Nigerian Army 3 Division, Maxwell Khobe Cantonment as well as a police station and the First bank of Nigeria.

The postal code of the area is 930.

Languages

Languages spoken in Bassa are Hausa, Irigwe, Amo, Rukuba, Buji– Boze language, Chawe, Jere, Gusu, Kurama, Limoro, Tarya, Sanga, Janji, Duguza and  Chokobo.

Festivals 
Some festivals in Bassa Local Government Area;
Remeze – Buji, Irigwe New Year Celebration, 
Anchoncho– a hunting festival of the Bache (Rukuba) people, 
Amo new-year celebration.

Food
Bassa people are very rich in agriculture as a result, they are able to produce and prepare the following traditional foods such as moimoi, Kpewe – This is prepared with Acha and beans, Tinni – It is cooked with Millet, Beni seed and beans as the major ingredients, Kambar – from sweet potatoes, gwote, water yam etc. They plant Irish potatoes, sweet potatoes, maize, tamba as well as soya beans.

References

Local Government Areas in Plateau State